Robert Wright  was Archdeacon of Carlisle from his installation on 12 July 1621 until his death on 16 January 1622.

References

Archdeacons of Carlisle
17th-century English Anglican priests
1622 deaths